Lathom is a civil parish in the West Lancashire district of Lancashire, England.  It contains 49 buildings that are recorded in the National Heritage List for England as designated listed buildings.  Of these, one is at Grade II*, the middle grade, and the others are at Grade II, the lowest grade.  The parish contains the village of Lathom, and is otherwise rural.  The most important building in the parish is Latham House, but most of this has been demolished, leaving only part of one wing.  This is listed, together with structures associated with it.  The Leeds and Liverpool Canal and its Rufford branch run through the parish, and the associated listed structures include culverts, locks and bridges.  There are also three former railway level crossing keeper's cottages built for the Manchester and Southport Railway.  Because of its rural nature, many of the listed buildings are farmhouses and farm buildings.  The other listed buildings include a chapel, almshouses, other bridges, houses and associated structures, lodges, a war memorial, and a school.


Key

Buildings

See also

Listed buildings in Lathom South

References

Citations

Sources

Lists of listed buildings in Lancashire
Buildings and structures in the Borough of West Lancashire